Tabanus lineola, also known as the striped horse fly, is a species of biting horse-fly. It is known from the eastern and southern United States and the Gulf coast of Mexico.

Description
Tabanus lineola females have a pale median stripe on their abdomen and are known for biting. The male does not bite and lacks hair on eyes.

References

Tabanidae
Insects described in 1794
Taxa named by Johan Christian Fabricius
Diptera of North America